Pauline Ngarmpring (also Palinee Ngarm-Pring) is a Thai politician. In March 2019, she ran for Prime Minister of Thailand, becoming the country's first transgender person to do so. She is affiliated with the Mahachon Party.

Biography 
In 1964, Pauline Ngarmpring was born male in Thailand. She later admitted she identified as a woman from an early age, but did not tell anyone due to the expectations of her parents.

Before her transition, Ngarmpring worked as a journalist before becoming a sports promoter in the Thai football community. She founded the football fan group Cheerthai Power, as well as ran for president of the Football Association of Thailand. She was also married with two children.

In 2013, she came out as a transgender woman, travelling to America to have sex reassignment surgery. In 2017, she returned to Thailand, where local media outlets dubbed her "Thailand's Caitlyn Jenner".

Political career 
Ngarmpring joined the Mahachon Party in late 2018; she was initially hired to assist the party with their strategy and policy. In 2019, she was named, along with two others, as the Mahachon Party's prime minister candidates in the 2019 Thai general election. This made her the first transgender individual to run for Prime Minister of Thailand.

References 

1964 births
Pauline Ngarmpring
Pauline Ngarmpring
Pauline Ngarmpring
Pauline Ngarmpring
Living people
Transgender politicians
Transgender women